Scott Rachal Verplank (born July 9, 1964) is an American professional golfer, who has played on the PGA Tour and the PGA Tour Champions.

Early years and amateur career
Born and raised in Dallas, Texas, Verplank was a leading member of the W.T. White High School golf team and a regular at Brookhaven Country Club in Dallas. He graduated from high school in 1982 and attended Oklahoma State University in Stillwater.  At OSU, he was a member of the 1983 NCAA Championship team, finishing T3 alongside teammates Tommy Moore, Willie Wood, Andy Dillard, and Philip Walton. He went on later to win the 1984 U.S. Amateur at the Oak Tree Golf Club, and in 1986, win the NCAA individual title.

Prior to his senior year at Oklahoma State, Verplank won the Western Open outside Chicago in August 1985; it was the first victory by an amateur on the PGA Tour in 29 years (Doug Sanders, 1956 Canadian Open). He defeated Jim Thorpe on the second extra hole of a playoff for the win at Butler National Golf Club in Oak Brook, Illinois.

Professional career
Verplank graduated and turned professional in 1986, using his two-year exemption on the PGA Tour; his first event as a pro was the U.S. Open at Shinnecock Hills in June, his sixth tour event  He earned five wins on the PGA Tour, and two Ryder Cup appearances, in 2002 and 2006. Verplank has type 1 diabetes and uses an insulin pump during play. He was awarded the 2002 Ben Hogan Award, given by the Golf Writers Association of America to an individual who has continued to be active in golf despite a physical handicap or serious illness.  Verplank has been featured in the top 20 of the Official World Golf Rankings, reaching as high as eleventh in 2001.

He hit a hole-in-one in the Ryder Cup, on the 14th hole during a singles match against Pádraig Harrington in 2006. The shot did not impact the overall result, however, as Europe had already won the trophy. Nonetheless, he was the first American player to card an ace during the Ryder Cup; his overall record in the competition is 4 wins and 1 loss.

Verplank's most recent win was the 2007 EDS Byron Nelson Championship, in which he defeated Luke Donald by one stroke.  As a Dallas native, Verplank called the EDS Byron Nelson Championship "a fifth major," and also mentioned that "Byron was with me today" (the 2007 tournament was the first held after Nelson's death). His best finish in a major championship was a tie for fourth at the PGA Championship in 2011.

In December 2010, Verplank was named a 2011 winner of the NCAA Silver Anniversary Award, given annually to six former NCAA student-athletes for distinguished career accomplishment on the 25th anniversary of their college graduation.

Verplank competed in the 2011 Arnold Palmer Invitational finishing T38 and then the following week at the Shell Houston Open in which Verplank finished T2 behind Phil Mickelson. Verplank had held a joint 54-hole lead with Mickelson and even held the lead on his own at a number of stages during the final round, however his lack of competitive golf proved costly throughout the final few holes and he was unable to close out the victory. This was his best finish on tour in 18 months since finishing T2 at the Deutsche Bank Championship in 2009. Verplank has amassed over $27 million in career earnings.

Verplank played the 2013 season on a Major Medical Extension after hip and wrist injuries in 2012. He started the 2014 season in a similar fashion, but was not able to satisfy the medical exemption and used his career money list exemption for the remainder of the season.

Amateur wins (7)
1983 Porter Cup
1984 U.S. Amateur, Sunnehanna Amateur
1985 Western Amateur, Sunnehanna Amateur, Porter Cup
1986 NCAA individual title

Professional wins (6)

PGA Tour wins (5)

PGA Tour playoff record (2–4)

Other wins (1)

Other playoff record (0–1)

Results in major championships

LA = Low amateur
CUT = missed the half-way cut
WD = withdrew
"T" = tied

Summary

Most consecutive cuts made – 5 (2004 Masters – 2005 Masters)
Longest streak of top-10s – 2 (2003 Masters – 2003 U.S. Open)

Results in The Players Championship

CUT = missed the halfway cut
WD = withdrew
"T" indicates a tie for a place

Results in World Golf Championships

1Cancelled due to 9/11

QF, R16, R32, R64 = Round in which player lost in match play
"T" = Tied
NT = No tournament
Note that the HSBC Champions did not become a WGC event until 2009.

U.S. national team appearances
Amateur
Eisenhower Trophy: 1984
Walker Cup: 1985 (winners)

Professional
World Cup: 1998 (individual title), 2004
Ryder Cup: 2002, 2006
Presidents Cup: 2005 (winners), 2007 (winners)
Wendy's 3-Tour Challenge (representing PGA Tour): 2006 (winners)

See also
1987 PGA Tour Qualifying School graduates
1997 PGA Tour Qualifying School graduates

References

External links

American male golfers
PGA Tour golfers
PGA Tour Champions golfers
Ryder Cup competitors for the United States
Oklahoma State Cowboys golfers
Golf writers and broadcasters
Golfers from Dallas
Golfers from Oklahoma
W. T. White High School alumni
People with type 1 diabetes
Sportspeople from Edmond, Oklahoma
1964 births
Living people